The 2007 FIBA Europe Under-18 Championship was an international basketball  competition held in Spain in 2007.

Final ranking

1. 

2.  Greece

3.  Latvia

4.  Lithuania

5.  Spain

6.  France

7.  Croatia

8.  Turkey

9.  Germany

10.  Russia

11.  Israel

12.  Estonia

13.  Italy

14.  Bulgaria

15.  Slovenia

16.  Romania

Awards

External links
FIBA Archive

FIBA U18 European Championship
2007–08 in European basketball
2007–08 in Spanish basketball
International youth basketball competitions hosted by Spain